The 2014–15 Dynamo Dresden season was the 65th season in the football club's history and the first season back in the 3. Liga after having been relegated in the previous season. In addition to the domestic league, Dynamo Dresden also participated in this season's edition of the DFB-Pokal, reaching the round of 16. This was the 62nd season for Dynamo Dresden in the DDV-Stadion, located in Dresden, Germany. The season covered a period from 1 July 2014 to 30 June 2015.

Players

Squad information

Transfers

Summer

In:

Out:

Winter

In:

Out:

Friendly matches

Competitions

3. Liga

League table

Results summary

Results by round

Matches

DFB-Pokal

Squad and statistics

|-
! colspan=14 style=background:#ffcc00; text-align:center| Goalkeepers

|-
! colspan=14 style=background:#ffcc00; text-align:center| Defenders

|-
! colspan=14 style=background:#ffcc00; text-align:center| Midfielders

|-
! colspan=14 style=background:#ffcc00; text-align:center| Forwards

|}

References

Dynamo Dresden seasons
Dresden, Dynamo